Enscepastra is  a genus of moths, belonging to the family Coleophoridae.

Species
Enscepastra acutissima Mey, 2011
Enscepastra curvipalpata Mey, 2011
Enscepastra cygnica Mey, 2011
Enscepastra lathraea (Meyrick, 1920)
Enscepastra longirostris Meyrick, 1926
Enscepastra plagiopa Meyrick, 1920
Enscepastra recurvata Mey, 2011
Enscepastra scolopacina Mey, 2011

Former species
Enscepastra machimopis Meyrick, 1936

References

Coleophoridae
Taxa named by Edward Meyrick
Moth genera